Rotundaria tuberculata, commonly called the purple wartyback, is a freshwater mussel, an aquatic bivalve mollusk.

This species is native to eastern North America, generally in the Mississippi River drainage, where it is wide-ranging. It is still common in many areas, particularly in the southern part of its range.

It was formerly classified as the sole species in the genus Cyclonaias, but in 2012 it was moved to Rotundaria based on genetic evidence.

References

Molluscs of the United States
tuberculata
Bivalves described in 1820
Taxa named by Constantine Samuel Rafinesque